WSIM (93.7 FM) is a radio station  broadcasting an adult hits format. Licensed to Lamar, South Carolina, United States, the station serves the Florence area.  The station is currently owned by Community Broadcasters, LLC and features programming from Westwood One .  The programming was also simulcast on the now-defunct WDKD.

Translators
In addition to the main station, WSIM has been relayed by a translator to widen its broadcast area. W246AW was "97.1 Frank FM", while W255BD has been a translator for WOLH.

History
This station played oldies for several years with the slogan "Good Time Rock and Roll".

More recently, it was adult contemporary. In September 2012, WSIM changed to hot adult contemporary.

On April 5, 2022, WSIM and its HD2 subchannel swapped its adult CHR "Star" and variety "Frank" formats.

On May 27, 2022, W298BI launched a classic hip hop format branded as "Jamz 107.5" on its HD-2 subchannel, with Star moving to HD-3.

References

External links

SIM
Adult hits radio stations in the United States